Hugh Porter (September 23, 1843August 1, 1936) was an American farmer and Republican politician from the U.S. state of Wisconsin.  He was a member of the Wisconsin State Assembly for three terms, representing Crawford County.

Biography
Hugh Porter was born in Morgan County, Ohio, on September 23, 1843.  He came west with his parents at age 12 to the town of Newport, in Columbia County, Wisconsin.  The family then briefly moved to Allamakee County, Iowa, before settling more permanently in the town of Seneca, Crawford County, Wisconsin, in the Fall of 1855.

In the last year of the American Civil War, he volunteered for service and was enrolled as a private in Company F of the 49th Wisconsin Infantry Regiment.  He was promoted to corporal before the regiment was mustered out in November 1865.  His regiment didn't see any combat, and was solely tasked with logistics and provost duties in Missouri.

He was elected chairman of the town board and president of the Crawford County Agricultural Society before running for Wisconsin State Assembly in 1886.  He won two consecutive terms in the Assembly, in 1886 and 1888, running on the Republican Party ticket; he was not a candidate in 1890.

He was elected to a third and final term in the Assembly in the 1898 election, serving in the 1899 session.  He did not run again in 1900.

After leaving the Assembly, he moved to Viroqua, Wisconsin, where he resided for the rest of his life.  There, in 1905, he was a co-founder of the Viroqua Co-Operative Creamery and served for several years on the board of directors.

He died at his home in Viroqua on August 1, 1836.

Electoral history

Wisconsin Assembly (1886, 1888)

| colspan="6" style="text-align:center;background-color: #e9e9e9;"| General Election, November 2, 1886

| colspan="6" style="text-align:center;background-color: #e9e9e9;"| General Election, November 6, 1888

Wisconsin Assembly (1898)

| colspan="6" style="text-align:center;background-color: #e9e9e9;"| General Election, November 8, 1898

References

External links
 

1843 births
1936 deaths
People from Morgan County, Ohio
People from Crawford County, Wisconsin
People from Viroqua, Wisconsin
Farmers from Wisconsin
Republican Party members of the Wisconsin State Assembly
19th-century American politicians